Papilio phegea may refer to:

 Elymniopsis
 Proterebia afra